The University Athletic Association of the Philippines fencing champions.

List of champions

Streaks
 University of the East owns the longest championship streak in the following divisions: 
 Men's = 8 (2012–2020)
 Women's = 11 (2007–2018)
 Boy's = 10 (2010–2020)
 Girl's = 9 (2011–2020)

Double championship
 University of the Philippines won a "double crown" in 1996–97 Season (as a demonstration sport).
 University of the East won a "double crown" in 2005–06, 2009–10, 2010–11 and 2011–12 seasons.

Triple championship
 University of the East won a "triple championship" in  UAAP Season 81 (2018–19).

Quadruple championship
 University of the East won a "quadruple championship" from 2012–13 to 2017–18 and 2019–20 UAAP seasons.

Number of championships by school

References

External links
UE's Male and Female Fencers Captures the 2006 UAAP Championship!
"Leading UE’s achievements in the 68th UAAP season’s seniors division were the respective championships of its men’s and women’s fencing teams—the fifth UAAP championship for the men’s team, the first for the women’s team."
UAAP Roundup; UP keeps women's fencing title, FEU rules men's side. (February 15, 2005)
UE retains UAAP men's fencing title. (February 13, 2007)
UE dominates UAAP fencing, Manila Times, February 14, 2016

Fencing
Fencing competitions